Kokomo Country Club is a private country club in Kokomo, Indiana. The club was established on June 13, 1904, to provide a course for local golf enthusiasts. The course was the home course of Indiana Golf Hall of Fame Member Robert Resner.

The course was added to the National Register of Historic Places on September 20, 2006.

References

External links
Kokomo Country Club Website
World Golf website
Howard County website

Sports in Kokomo, Indiana
Clubhouses on the National Register of Historic Places in Indiana
1904 establishments in Indiana
National Register of Historic Places in Howard County, Indiana
Golf clubs and courses in Indiana
Buildings and structures in Howard County, Indiana